Swartzia haughtii is a species of flowering plant in the family Fabaceae. It is found only in Ecuador. Its natural habitat is subtropical or tropical moist lowland forests.

References

haughtii
Flora of Ecuador
Vulnerable plants
Taxonomy articles created by Polbot